The year 2011 is the 6th year in the history of Strikeforce, a mixed martial arts promotion based in the United States. In 2011 Strikeforce held 16 events beginning with, Strikeforce Challengers: Woodley vs. Saffiedine.

Title fights

Events list

Strikeforce Challengers: Woodley vs. Saffiedine

Strikeforce Challengers: Woodley vs. Saffiedine was an event held on January 7, 2011 at the Nashville Municipal Auditorium in Nashville, Tennessee.

Results

Strikeforce: Diaz vs. Cyborg

Strikeforce: Diaz vs. Cyborg was an event held on January 29, 2011 at the HP Pavilion at San Jose in San Jose, California.

Results

Strikeforce: Fedor vs. Silva

Strikeforce: Fedor vs. Silva was an event held on February 12, 2011 at the Izod Center in East Rutherford, New Jersey.

Results

Strikeforce Challengers: Beerbohm vs. Healy

Strikeforce Challengers: Beerbohm vs. Healy was an event held on February 18, 2011 at the Cedar Park Center in Cedar Park, Texas.

Results

Strikeforce: Feijao vs. Henderson

Strikeforce: Feijao vs. Henderson was an event held on March 5, 2011 at the Nationwide Arena in Columbus, Ohio.

Results

Strikeforce Challengers: Wilcox vs. Damm

Strikeforce Challengers: Wilcox vs. Damm was an event held on April 1, 2011 at the Stockton Arena in Stockton, California.

Results

Strikeforce: Diaz vs. Daley

Strikeforce: Diaz vs. Daley was an event held on April 9, 2011 at the Valley View Casino Center in San Diego, California.

Results

Strikeforce: Overeem vs. Werdum

Strikeforce: Overeem vs. Werdum was an event held on June 18, 2011 at the American Airlines Center in Dallas, Texas.

Results

Strikeforce Challengers: Fodor vs. Terry

Strikeforce Challengers: Fodor vs. Terry was an event held on June 24, 2011 at the ShoWare Center in Kent, Washington.

Results

Strikeforce Challengers: Voelker vs. Bowling III

Strikeforce Challengers: Voelker vs. Bowling III was an event held on July 22, 2011 at the Palms Casino Resort in Las Vegas, Nevada.

Results

Strikeforce: Fedor vs. Henderson

Strikeforce: Fedor vs. Henderson was an event held on July 30, 2011 at the Sears Centre in Hoffman Estates, Illinois.

Results

Strikeforce Challengers: Gurgel vs. Duarte

Strikeforce Challengers: Gurgel vs. Duarte was an event held on August 12, 2011 at the Palms Casino Resort in Las Vegas, Nevada.

Results

Strikeforce: Barnett vs. Kharitonov

Strikeforce: Barnett vs. Kharitonov was an event held on September 10, 2011 at the U.S. Bank Arena in Cincinnati, Ohio.

Results

Strikeforce Challengers: Larkin vs. Rossborough

Strikeforce Challengers: Larkin vs. Rossborough was an event held on September 23, 2011 at the Palms Casino Resort in Las Vegas, Nevada.

Results

Strikeforce Challengers: Britt vs. Sayers

Strikeforce Challengers: Britt vs. Sayers was an event held on November 18, 2011 at the Palms Casino Resort in Las Vegas, Nevada.

Results

Strikeforce: Melendez vs. Masvidal

Strikeforce: Melendez vs. Masvidal was an event held on December 17, 2011 at the Valley View Casino Center in San Diego, California.

Results

See also 
 List of Strikeforce champions
 List of Strikeforce events

References

Strikeforce (mixed martial arts) events
2011 in mixed martial arts